Camaegeria exochiformis is a moth of the family Sesiidae. It is known from Ghana and Sierra Leone.

References

Walker 1856b. List of the Specimens of Lepidopterous Insects in the Collection of the British Museum. Part VIII.– Sphingidae. - — 8:i–iv, 1–271.
Bartsch D. & Berg J.,  2012. New Species and review of the Afrotropical clearwing moths genus Camaegeria Strand, 1914 (Lep.:Sesiidae: Synanthedonini). - Zootaxa 3181: 28-46 (2012), preview

Sesiidae
Moths described in 1856
Moths of Africa
Insects of West Africa